Cressing railway station is on the Braintree Branch Line in the East of England, serving the villages of Cressing and Black Notley, Essex. Its three-letter station code is CES. The platform has an operational length for nine-coach trains.

The station is currently managed by Abellio Greater Anglia, which also operates all trains serving it.

History
The Maldon, Witham & Braintree Railway (MWBR) was authorised in 1846 but prior to its opening the company was absorbed by the Eastern Counties Railway (ECR). The line opened for goods traffic on 15 August 1848, and for passenger services on 2 October 1848; it was double-tracked throughout until the Crimean War.

The station, originally named Bulford, was also opened on 2 October 1848. It was renamed Cressing on 1 February 1911. It is suggested that the large crossing gates were present because Cressing had a passing loop until after World War I, and retained the loop for freight purposes until goods traffic ceased on the line in 1964.
  
The station was owned by the Great Eastern Railway (GER) from 1862 to 1923, but as the building does not show typical GER architectural canopy support features, it is likely that it pre-dates the GER. Although there does not appear to be any obvious evidence (as in the case of Maldon East & Heybridge which displays "MWB" on the gulleys at the top of its downpipes) that it was built when the line first opened, that is a possibility and if so would make it the only surviving MWBR structure on this railway.

There was originally a signal box on the platform, next to the level crossing. This was removed and relocated to the preserved Colne Valley Railway at Castle Hedingham in the 1970s.

Services

On Sundays all services terminate at Witham and passengers travelling on towards London must change for a connecting main line train.

Services are typically formed by Class 321 and Class 720 units.

References

External links

More pictures on Flickr

 

Railway stations in Essex
DfT Category F2 stations
Former Great Eastern Railway stations
Railway stations in Great Britain opened in 1848
Greater Anglia franchise railway stations